The Europe/Africa Zone was one of the three zones of the regional Davis Cup competition in 2016.

In the Europe/Africa Zone there were three different tiers, called groups, in which teams competed against each other to advance to the upper tier. Winners in Group I advanced to the World Group Play-offs, along with losing teams from the World Group first round. Teams who lost their respective ties competed in the relegation play-offs, with winning teams remaining in Group I, whereas teams who lost their play-offs were relegated to the Europe/Africa Zone Group II in 2017.

Participating nations

Seeds: 
 
 
 
 

Remaining nations:

Draw

 and  relegated to Group II in 20.

First round

Romania vs. Slovenia

Portugal vs. Austria

Russia vs. Sweden

Hungary vs. Israel

Second round

Romania vs. Spain

Ukraine vs. Austria

Russia vs. Netherlands

Hungary vs. Slovakia

First round play-offs

Sweden vs. Netherlands

Second round play-offs

Portugal vs. Slovenia

Israel vs. Sweden

References

External links
Official Website

Asia/Oceania Zone Group I
Davis Cup Europe/Africa Zone